Upper Mud River Wildlife Management Area, is located about  south of Hamlin, West Virginia in Lincoln County, U.S.A.  Upper Mud River WMA is located on  of steeply forested terrain.

Hunting and Fishing

Hunting opportunities in the WMA include deer, grouse, rabbit, raccoon, squirrel, turkey, and waterfowl.

The  lake at Upper Mud River WMA provides fishing opportunities for largemouth bass, bluegill, channel catfish, crappie, and muskellunge.

Amenities at the WMA include a swimming beach with a bath house, picnic areas, playgrounds, a softball field, and restrooms.  However, camping is not available at the WMA.

See also

Animal conservation
Hunting
fishing
List of West Virginia wildlife management areas

References

External links
West Virginia DNR District 5 Wildlife Management Areas
West Virginia Hunting Regulations
West Virginia Fishing Regulations

Wildlife management areas of West Virginia
Protected areas of Lincoln County, West Virginia
IUCN Category V